The Encounter of Man and Nature: The Spiritual Crisis of Modern Man is a 1968 book by the Iranian philosopher Seyyed Hossein Nasr.

See also
 Religion and the Order of Nature

References

Sources

 
 
 
 
 

Seyyed Hossein Nasr